White supremacy is the belief that white people are superior to those of other races and thus should dominate them. The belief favors the maintenance and defense of any power and privilege held by white people. White supremacy has roots in the now-discredited doctrine of scientific racism and was a key justification for European colonialism.

As a political ideology, it imposes and maintains cultural, social, political, historical, and/or institutional domination by white people and non-white supporters. In the past, this ideology had been put into effect through socioeconomic and legal structures such as the Atlantic slave trade, Jim Crow laws in the United States, the White Australia policies from the 1890s to the mid-1970s, and apartheid in South Africa. This ideology is also today present among neo-Confederates.

White supremacy underlies a spectrum of contemporary movements including white nationalism, white separatism, neo-Nazism, and the Christian Identity movement. In the United States, white supremacy is primarily associated with the Ku Klux Klan (KKK), Aryan Nations, and the White American Resistance movement, all of which are also considered to be antisemitic. The Proud Boys, despite claiming non-association with white supremacy, have been described in academic contexts as being such. In recent years, websites such as Twitter, Reddit, and Stormfront, and the presidential campaign of Donald Trump, have contributed to an increased activity and interest in white supremacy.

Different forms of white supremacy have different conceptions of who is considered white (though the exemplar is generally light-skinned, blond-haired, and blue-eyed—traits most common in northern Europe, which are pseudoscientifically viewed as being part of an Aryan race), and not all white supremacist organizations agree on who is their greatest enemy. Different groups of white supremacists identify various racial, ethnic, religious, and other enemies, most commonly those of Sub-Saharan African ancestry, Indigenous peoples of the Americas and Oceania, Asians, multiracial people, Middle Eastern people, Jews, Muslims, and LGBTQ+ people.

In academic usage, particularly in critical race theory or intersectionality, "white supremacy" can also refer to a social system in which white people enjoy structural advantages (privilege) over other ethnic groups, on both a collective and individual level, despite formal legal equality.

History
White supremacy has ideological foundations that date back to 17th-century scientific racism, the predominant paradigm of human variation that helped shape international relations and racial policy from the latter part of the Age of Enlightenment until the late 20th century (marked by decolonization and the abolition of apartheid in South Africa in 1991, followed by that country's first multiracial elections in 1994).

United States

Early history 
White supremacy was dominant in the United States both before and after the American Civil War, and it persisted for decades after the Reconstruction Era. Prior to the Civil War, many wealthy White-European Americans owned slaves; they tried to justify their economic exploitation of Black people by creating a "scientific" theory of White superiority and Black inferiority. One such slave owner, future president Thomas Jefferson, wrote in 1785 that Blacks were "inferior to the whites in the endowments of body and mind." In the antebellum South, four million slaves were denied freedom. The outbreak of the Civil War saw the desire to uphold white supremacy being cited as a cause for state secession and the formation of the Confederate States of America. In an editorial about Native Americans and the American Indian Wars in 1890, author L. Frank Baum wrote: "The Whites, by law of conquest, by justice of civilization, are masters of the American continent, and the best safety of the frontier settlements will be secured by the total annihilation of the few remaining Indians."

The Naturalization Act of 1790 limited U.S. citizenship to whites only. In some parts of the United States, many people who were considered non-white were disenfranchised, barred from government office, and prevented from holding most government jobs well into the second half of the 20th century. Professor Leland T. Saito of the University of Southern California writes: "Throughout the history of the United States, race has been used by whites for legitimizing and creating difference and social, economic and political exclusion."

20th century 
The denial of social and political freedom to minorities continued into the mid-20th century, resulting in the civil rights movement. The movement was spurred by the lynching of Emmett Till, a 14-year-old boy. David Jackson writes it was the image of the "murdered child’s ravaged body, that forced the world to reckon with the brutality of American racism." Vann R. Newkirk| wrote "the trial of his killers became a pageant illuminating the tyranny of white supremacy." Moved by the image of Till's body in the casket, one hundred days after his murder Rosa Parks refused to give up her seat on a bus to a white person.

Sociologist Stephen Klineberg has stated that U.S. immigration laws prior to 1965 clearly "declared that Northern Europeans are a superior subspecies of the white race". The Immigration and Nationality Act of 1965 opened entry to the U.S. to non-Germanic groups, and significantly altered the demographic mix in the U.S. as a result. With 38 U.S. states having banned interracial marriage through anti-miscegenation laws, the last 16 states had such laws in place until 1967 when they were invalidated by the Supreme Court of the United States' decision in Loving v. Virginia. These mid-century gains had a major impact on white Americans' political views; segregation and white racial superiority, which had been publicly endorsed in the 1940s, became minority views within the white community by the mid-1970s, and continued to decline into 1990s polls to a single-digit percentage. For sociologist Howard Winant, these shifts marked the end of "monolithic white supremacy" in the United States.

After the mid-1960s, white supremacy remained an important ideology to the American far-right. According to Kathleen Belew, a historian of race and racism in the United States, white militancy shifted after the Vietnam War from supporting the existing racial order to a more radical position (self-described as "white power" or "white nationalism") committed to overthrowing the United States government and establishing a white homeland. Such anti-government militia organizations are one of three major strands of violent right-wing movements in the United States, with white supremacist groups (such as the Ku Klux Klan, neo-Nazi organizations, and racist skinheads) and a religious fundamentalist movement (such as Christian Identity) being the other two. Howard Winant writes that, "On the far right the cornerstone of white identity is belief in an ineluctable, unalterable racialized difference between whites and nonwhites." In the view of philosopher Jason Stanley, white supremacy in the United States is an example of the fascist politics of hierarchy, in that it "demands and implies a perpetual hierarchy" in which whites dominate and control non-whites.

21st century 
The presidential campaign of Donald Trump led to a surge of interest in white supremacy and white nationalism in the United States, bringing increased media attention and new members to their movement; his campaign enjoyed their widespread support.

Some academics argue that outcomes from the 2016 United States Presidential Election reflect ongoing challenges with white supremacy. Psychologist Janet Helms suggested that the normalizing behaviors of social institutions of education, government, and healthcare are organized around the "birthright of...the power to control society's resources and determine the rules for [those resources]". Educators, literary theorists, and other political experts have raised similar questions, connecting the scapegoating of disenfranchised populations to white superiority.

As of 2018, there were over 600 white supremacy organizations recorded in the U.S. On July 23, 2019, Christopher A. Wray, the head of the FBI, said at a Senate Judiciary Committee hearing that the agency had made around 100 domestic terrorism arrests since October 1, 2018, and that the majority of them were connected in some way with white supremacy. Wray said that the Bureau was "aggressively pursuing [domestic terrorism] using both counterterrorism resources and criminal investigative resources and partnering closely with our state and local partners," but said that it was focused on the violence itself and not on its ideological basis. A similar number of arrests had been made for instances of international terrorism. In the past, Wray has said that white supremacy was a significant and "pervasive" threat to the U.S.

On September 20, 2019, the acting Secretary of Homeland Security, Kevin McAleenan, announced his department's revised strategy for counter-terrorism, which included a new emphasis on the dangers inherent in the white supremacy movement. McAleenan called white supremacy one of the most "potent ideologies" behind domestic terrorism-related violent acts. In a speech at the Brookings Institution, McAleenan cited a series of high-profile shooting incidents, and said "In our modern age, the continued menace of racially based violent extremism, particularly white supremacist extremism, is an abhorrent affront to the nation, the struggle and unity of its diverse population." The new strategy will include better tracking and analysis of threats, sharing information with local officials, training local law enforcement on how to deal with shooting events, discouraging the hosting of hate sites online, and encouraging counter-messages.

In a 2020 article in The New York Times titled "How White Women Use Themselves as Instruments of Terror", columnist Charles M. Blow wrote:

Patterns of influence

Political violence 
The Tuskegee Institute has estimated that 3,446 blacks were the victims of lynchings in the United States between 1882 and 1968, with the peak occurring in the 1890s at a time of economic stress in the South and increasing political suppression of blacks. If 1,297 whites were also lynched during this period, blacks were disproportionally targeted, representing 72.7% of all people lynched. According to scholar Amy L. Wood, "lynching photographs constructed and perpetuated white supremacist ideology by creating permanent images of a controlled white citizenry juxtaposed to images of helpless and powerless black men."

School curriculum 

White supremacy has also played a part in U.S. school curriculum. Over the course of the 19th, 20th, and 21st centuries, material across the spectrum of academic disciplines has been taught with a heavy emphasis on White culture, contributions, and experiences, and a lack of representation of non-White groups' perspectives and accomplishments. In the 19th century, Geography lessons contained teachings on a fixed racial hierarchy, which white people topped. Mills (1994) writes that history as it is taught is really the history of White people, and it is taught in a way that favors White Americans and White people in general. He states that the language used to tell history minimizes the violent acts committed by White people over the centuries, citing the use of the words, for example, "discovery," "colonization," and "New World" when describing what was ultimately a European conquest of the Western Hemisphere and its indigenous peoples. Swartz (1992) seconds this reading of modern history narratives when it comes to the experiences, resistances, and accomplishments of Black Americans throughout the Middle Passage, slavery, Reconstruction, Jim Crow, and the Civil rights movement. In an analysis of American history textbooks, she highlights word choices that repetitively "normalize" slavery and the inhumane treatment of Black people. She also notes the frequent showcasing of White abolitionists and actual exclusion of Black abolitionists and the fact that Black Americans had been mobilizing for abolition for centuries before the major White American push for abolition in the 19th century. She ultimately asserts the presence of a masternarrative that centers Europe and its associated peoples (White people) in school curriculum, particularly as it pertains to history. She writes that this masternarrative condenses history into only history that is relevant to, and to some extent beneficial for, White Americans.

Elson (1964) provides detailed information about the historic dissemination of simplistic and negative ideas about non-White races. Native Americans, who were subjected to attempts of cultural genocide by the U.S. government through the use of American Indian boarding schools, were characterized as homogenously "cruel," a violent menace toward White Americans, and lacking civilization or societal complexity (p. 74). For example, in the 19th century, Black Americans were consistently portrayed as lazy, immature, and intellectually and morally inferior to white Americans, and in many ways not deserving of equal participation in U.S. society. For example, a math problem in a 19th-century textbook read, "If 5 white men can do as much work as 7 negroes..." implying that white men are more industrious and competent than black men (p. 99). In addition, little to none was taught about Black Americans' contributions, or their histories before being brought to U.S. soil as slaves. According to Wayne (1972), this approach was taken especially much after the Civil War to maintain Whites' hegemony over emancipated Black Americans. Other racial groups have received oppressive treatment, including Mexican Americans, who were temporarily prevented from learning the same curriculum as White Americans because they were supposedly intellectually inferior, and Asian Americans, some of whom were prevented from learning much about their ancestral lands because they were deemed a threat to "American" culture, i.e. White culture, at the turn of the 20th century.

Role of the internet 
With the emergence of Twitter in 2006, and platforms such as Stormfront which was launched in 1996, an alt-right portal for white supremacists with similar beliefs, both adults and children, was provided in which they were given a way to connect. Jessie Daniels, of CUNY-Hunter College, discussed the emergence of other social media outlets such as 4chan and Reddit, which meant that the "spread of white nationalist symbols and ideas could be accelerated and amplified." Sociologist Kathleen Blee notes that the anonymity which the Internet provides can make it difficult to track the extent of white supremacist activity in the country, but nevertheless she and other experts see an increase in the amount of hate crimes and white supremacist violence. In the latest wave of white supremacy, in the age of the Internet, Blee sees the movement as having primarily become a virtual one, in which divisions between groups become blurred: "[A]ll these various groups that get jumbled together as the alt-right and people who have come in from the more traditional neo-Nazi world. We're in a very different world now."

David Duke, a former Grand Wizard of the Ku Klux Klan, wrote in 1999 that the Internet was going to create a "chain reaction of racial enlightenment that will shake the world." Daniels documents that racist groups see the Internet as a way to spread their ideologies, influence others and gain supporters. Legal scholar Richard Hasen describes a "dark side" of social media:

There certainly were hate groups before the Internet and social media. [But with social media] it just becomes easier to organize, to spread the word, for people to know where to go. It could be to raise money, or it could be to engage in attacks on social media. Some of the activity is virtual. Some of it is in a physical place. Social media has lowered the collective-action problems that individuals who might want to be in a hate group would face. You can see that there are people out there like you. That's the dark side of social media.

A series on YouTube hosted by the grandson of Thomas Robb, the national director of the Knights of the Ku Klux Klan, "presents the Klan's ideology in a format aimed at kids — more specifically, white kids." The short episodes inveigh against race-mixing, and extol other white supremacist ideologies. A short documentary published by TRT describes Imran Garda's experience, a journalist of Indian descent, who met with Thomas Robb and a traditional KKK group. A sign that greets people who enter the town states "Diversity is a code for white genocide." The KKK group interviewed in the documentary summarizes its ideals, principles, and beliefs, which are emblematic of white supremacists in the United States. The comic book super hero Captain America was used for dog whistle politics by the alt-right in college campus recruitment in 2017, an ironic co-optation because Captain America battled against Nazis in the comics, and was created by Jewish cartoonists.

British Commonwealth 

There has been debate whether Winston Churchill, who was voted "the greatest ever Briton" in 2002, was "a racist and white supremacist". In the context of rejecting the Arab wish to stop Jewish immigration to Palestine, he said:
I do not admit that the dog in the manger has the final right to the manger, though he may have lain there for a very long time. I do not admit that right. I do not admit for instance that a great wrong has been done to the Red Indians of America or the black people of Australia. I do not admit that a wrong has been done to those people by the fact that a stronger race, a higher-grade race or at any rate a more worldly-wise race ... has come in and taken their place."

British historian Richard Toye, author of Churchill's Empire, concluded that "Churchill did think that white people were superior."

South Africa

A number of Southern African nations experienced severe racial tension and conflict during global decolonization, particularly as white Africans of European ancestry fought to protect their preferential social and political status. Racial segregation in South Africa began in colonial times under the Dutch Empire. It continued when the British took over the Cape of Good Hope in 1795. Apartheid was introduced as an officially structured policy by the Afrikaner-dominated National Party after the general election of 1948. Apartheid's legislation divided inhabitants into four racial groups—"black", "white", "coloured", and "Indian", with coloured divided into several sub-classifications. In 1970, the Afrikaner-run government abolished non-white political representation, and starting that year black people were deprived of South African citizenship. South Africa abolished apartheid in 1991.

Rhodesia
In Rhodesia a predominantly white government issued its own unilateral declaration of independence from the United Kingdom during an unsuccessful attempt to avoid immediate majority rule. Following the Rhodesian Bush War which was fought by African nationalists, Rhodesian prime minister Ian Smith acceded to biracial political representation in 1978 and the state achieved recognition from the United Kingdom as Zimbabwe in 1980.

Germany

Nazism promoted the idea of a superior Germanic people or Aryan race in Germany during the early 20th century. Notions of white supremacy and Aryan racial superiority were combined in the 19th century, with white supremacists maintaining the belief that white people were members of an Aryan "master race" that was superior to other races, particularly the Jews, who were described as the "Semitic race", Slavs, and Gypsies, who they associated with "cultural sterility". Arthur de Gobineau, a French racial theorist and aristocrat, blamed the fall of the ancien régime in France on racial degeneracy caused by racial intermixing, which he argued had destroyed the "purity" of the Nordic or Germanic race. Gobineau's theories, which attracted a strong following in Germany, emphasized the existence of an irreconcilable polarity between Aryan or Germanic peoples and Jewish culture.

As the Nazi Party's chief racial theorist, Alfred Rosenberg oversaw the construction of a human racial "ladder" that justified Hitler's racial and ethnic policies. Rosenberg promoted the Nordic theory, which regarded Nordics as the "master race", superior to all others, including other Aryans (Indo-Europeans). Rosenberg got the racial term Untermensch from the title of Klansman Lothrop Stoddard's 1922 book The Revolt Against Civilization: The Menace of the Under-man. It was later adopted by the Nazis from that book's German version Der Kulturumsturz: Die Drohung des Untermenschen (1925). Rosenberg was the leading Nazi who attributed the concept of the East-European "under man" to Stoddard. An advocate of the U.S. immigration laws that favored Northern Europeans, Stoddard wrote primarily on the alleged dangers posed by "colored" peoples to white civilization, and wrote The Rising Tide of Color Against White World-Supremacy in 1920. In establishing a restrictive entry system for Germany in 1925, Hitler wrote of his admiration for America's immigration laws: "The American Union categorically refuses the immigration of physically unhealthy elements, and simply excludes the immigration of certain races."

German praise for America's institutional racism, previously found in Hitler's Mein Kampf, was continuous throughout the early 1930s. Nazi lawyers were advocates of the use of American models. Race-based U.S. citizenship and anti-miscegenation laws directly inspired the Nazis' two principal Nuremberg racial laws—the Citizenship Law and the Blood Law. To preserve the Aryan or Nordic race, the Nazis introduced the Nuremberg Laws in 1935, which forbade sexual relations and marriages between Germans and Jews, and later between Germans and Romani and Slavs. The Nazis used the Mendelian inheritance theory to argue that social traits were innate, claiming that there was a racial nature associated with certain general traits such as inventiveness or criminal behavior.

According to the 2012 annual report of Germany's interior intelligence service, the Federal Office for the Protection of the Constitution, at the time there were 26,000 right-wing extremists living in Germany, including 6,000 neo-Nazis.

Australia and New Zealand 
Fifty-one people died from two consecutive terrorist attacks at the Al Noor Mosque and the Linwood Islamic Centre by an Australian white supremacist carried out on March 15, 2019. The terrorist attacks have been described by Prime Minister Jacinda Ardern as "One of New Zealand's darkest days". On August 27, 2020, the shooter was sentenced to life without parole.

Ideologies and movements
Supporters of Nordicism consider the "Nordic peoples" to be a superior race. By the early 19th century, white supremacy was attached to emerging theories of racial hierarchy. The German philosopher Arthur Schopenhauer attributed cultural primacy to the white race:

The eugenicist Madison Grant argued in his 1916 book, The Passing of the Great Race, that the Nordic race had been responsible for most of humanity's great achievements, and that admixture was "race suicide". In this book, Europeans who are not of Germanic origin but have Nordic characteristics such as blonde/red hair and blue/green/gray eyes, were considered to be a Nordic admixture and suitable for Aryanization.

In the United States, the groups most associated with the white supremacist movement are the Ku Klux Klan (KKK), Aryan Nations, and the White American Resistance movement, all of which are also considered to be antisemitic. The Proud Boys, despite claiming non-association with white supremacy, have been described in academic contexts as being such. Many white supremacist groups are based on the concept of preserving genetic purity, and do not focus solely on discrimination based on skin color. The KKK's reasons for supporting racial segregation are not primarily based on religious ideals, but some Klan groups are openly Protestant. The 1915 silent drama film The Birth of a Nation followed the rising racial, economic, political, and geographic tensions leading up to the Emancipation Proclamation and the Southern Reconstruction era that was the genesis of the Ku Klux Klan.

Nazi Germany promulgated white supremacy based on the belief that the Aryan race, or the Germans, were the master race. It was combined with a eugenics programme that aimed for racial hygiene through compulsory sterilization of sick individuals and extermination of Untermenschen ("subhumans"): Slavs, Jews and Romani, which eventually culminated in the Holocaust.

Christian Identity is another movement closely tied to white supremacy. Some white supremacists identify themselves as Odinists, although many Odinists reject white supremacy. Some white supremacist groups, such as the South African Boeremag, conflate elements of Christianity and Odinism. Creativity (formerly known as "The World Church of the Creator") is atheistic and it denounces Christianity and other theistic religions. Aside from this, its ideology is similar to that of many Christian Identity groups because it believes in the antisemitic conspiracy theory that there is a "Jewish conspiracy" in control of governments, the banking industry and the media. Matthew F. Hale, founder of the World Church of the Creator, has published articles stating that all races other than white are "mud races", which is what the group's religion teaches.

The white supremacist ideology has become associated with a racist faction of the skinhead subculture, despite the fact that when the skinhead culture first developed in the United Kingdom in the late 1960s, it was heavily influenced by black fashions and music, especially Jamaican reggae and ska, and African American soul music.

White supremacist recruitment activities are primarily conducted at a grassroots level as well as on the Internet. Widespread access to the Internet has led to a dramatic increase in white supremacist websites. The Internet provides a venue to openly express white supremacist ideas at little social cost, because people who post the information are able to remain anonymous.

White nationalism

White separatism 

White separatism is a political and social movement that seeks the separation of white people from people of other races and ethnicities. This may include the establishment of a white ethnostate by removing non-whites from existing communities or by forming new communities elsewhere.

Most modern researchers do not view white separatism as distinct from white supremacist beliefs. The Anti-Defamation League defines white separatism as "a form of white supremacy"; the Southern Poverty Law Center defines both white nationalism and white separatism as "ideologies based on white supremacy." Facebook has banned content that is openly white nationalist or white separatist because "white nationalism and white separatism cannot be meaningfully separated from white supremacy and organized hate groups".

Use of the term to self-identify has been criticized as a dishonest rhetorical ploy. The Anti-Defamation League argues that white supremacists use the phrase because they believe it has fewer negative connotations than the term white supremacist.

Dobratz & Shanks-Meile reported that adherents usually reject marriage "outside the white race". They argued for the existence of "a distinction between the white supremacist's desire to dominate (as in apartheid, slavery, or segregation) and complete separation by race". They argued that this is a matter of pragmatism, that while many white supremacists are also white separatists, contemporary white separatists reject the view that returning to a system of segregation is possible or desirable in the United States.

Notable white separatists

Aligned organizations and philosophies 
 Aryan Brotherhood
 Christian Identity
 Council of Conservative Citizens
 Ethnopluralism
 Eurocentrism
 Ku Klux Klan
 National-anarchism
 Neo-Confederate
 New Orleans Protocol
 Northwest Territorial Imperative
 White pride

Academic use of the term
The term white supremacy is used in some academic studies of racial power to denote a system of structural or societal racism which privileges white people over others, regardless of the presence or the absence of racial hatred. According to this definition, white racial advantages occur at both a collective and an individual level (ceteris paribus, when individuals are compared that do not relevantly differ except in ethnicity). Legal scholar Frances Lee Ansley explains this definition as follows:

This and similar definitions have been adopted or proposed by Charles W. Mills, bell hooks, David Gillborn, Jessie Daniels, and Neely Fuller Jr, and they are widely used in critical race theory and intersectional feminism. Some anti-racist educators, such as Betita Martinez and the Challenging White Supremacy workshop, also use the term in this way. The term expresses historic continuities between a pre–civil rights movement era of open white supremacy and the current racial power structure of the United States. It also expresses the visceral impact of structural racism through "provocative and brutal" language that characterizes racism as "nefarious, global, systemic, and constant". Academic users of the term sometimes prefer it to racism because it allows for a distinction to be drawn between racist feelings and white racial advantage or privilege. John McWhorter, a specialist in language and race relations, explains the gradual replacement of "racism" by "white supremacy" by the fact that "potent terms need refreshment, especially when heavily used", drawing a parallel with the replacement of "chauvinist" by "sexist".

Other intellectuals have criticized the term's recent rise in popularity among leftist activists as counterproductive. John McWhorter has described the use of "white supremacy" as straying from its commonly accepted meaning to encompass less extreme issues, thereby cheapening the term and potentially derailing productive discussion. Political columnist Kevin Drum attributes the term's growing popularity to frequent use by Ta-Nehisi Coates, describing it as a "terrible fad" which fails to convey nuance. He claims that the term should be reserved for those who are trying to promote the idea that whites are inherently superior to blacks and not used to characterize less blatantly racist beliefs or actions. The academic use of the term to refer to systemic racism has been criticized by Conor Friedersdorf for the confusion it creates for the general public inasmuch as it differs from the more common dictionary definition; he argues that it is likely to alienate those it hopes to convince.

See also

 Afrophobia
 Anti-Mexican sentiment
 Anti-Romani sentiment
 Antisemitism
 Black supremacy
 Boreal (politics and culture)
 Christian Identity
 Creativity (religion)
 Frances Cress Welsing
 Heroes of the Fiery Cross (book)
 Hispanophobia
 Kinism
 Me and White Supremacy (book)
 Race and intelligence
 Racism against Black Americans
 "The White Man's Burden" (poem)
 Western Supremacy (book)
 White nationalist organizations
 White power skinheads
 White power symbol (disambiguation)
 White pride
 White nationalism

Notes

References

Further reading
 Brooks, Michael E. and Fitrakis, Robert (2021). A History of Hate in Ohio: Then and Now. The Ohio State University Press. 

Bessis, Sophie (2003) Western Supremacy: The Triumph of an Idea. Zed Books.  
Dobratz, Betty A. and Shanks-Meile, Stephanie (2000) "White Power, White Pride!": The White Separatist Movement in the United States. Johns Hopkins University Press. 
Horne, Gerald. (2017) The Apocalypse of Settler Colonialism: The Roots of Slavery White Supremacy and Capitalism in Seventeenth-Century North America and the Caribbean. New York: Monthly Review Press; ISBN 9781583676639.
Horne, Gerald. (2020). The Dawning of the Apocalypse: The Roots of Slavery White Supremacy Settler Colonialism and Capitalism in the Long Sixteenth Century. New York: Monthly Review Press. ISBN 9781583678725.
MacCann, Donnarae (2000) White Supremacy in Children's Literature: Characterizations of African Americans, 1830–1900. New York: Routledge. 
Van der Pijl, Kees, The Discipline of Western Supremacy: Modes of Foreign Relations and Political Economy, Volume III, Pluto Press, 2014,

External links

"Heart of Whiteness"—A documentary film about what it means to be white in South Africa
"Voices on Antisemitism"—Interview with Frank Meeink from the U.S. Holocaust Memorial Museum
"Russell Moore: White supremacy angers Jesus, but does it anger his church?" the president of the Ethics & Religious Liberty Commission of the Southern Baptist Convention.
“Exterminate All the Brutes, Reviewed: A Vast, Agonizing History of White Supremacy" (HBO Series), by Richard Brody, April 9, 2021, The New Yorker

 
Neo-fascism
Neo-Nazi concepts
Political theories
Politics and race
Racial segregation
Reconstruction Era
Political movements in the United States
White separatism